Meza mabea, the dark brown missile, is a butterfly in the family Hesperiidae. It is found in Guinea, Sierra Leone, Ivory Coast, Ghana, Cameroon, Gabon, the Republic of the Congo, the Central African Republic and western Tanzania. The habitat consists of drier forests.

The larvae feed on Dalbergia heudelotti, Dalbergia oblongifolia and Baphia pubescens.

References

Butterflies described in 1894
Erionotini
Butterflies of Africa